Camila de María Mulet (born 30 April 1991) is an indoor and field hockey player from Uruguay.

Career

Indoor
Camila de María made her debut for the Uruguayan indoor team at the 2010 Indoor Pan American Cup, where she won a silver medal.

She went on to represent the team again at the 2017 and 2021 Indoor Pan American Cups, winning bronze at the former.

Field hockey
Following her appearances with the national indoor team, De María went on to debut for the national team in 2018 at the South American Games, where she won a silver medal.

In 2019, she appeared at the FIH Series Finals in Hiroshima, and the Pan American Games in Lima.

References

External links

1991 births
Living people
Female field hockey forwards
Uruguayan female field hockey players
Place of birth missing (living people)
South American Games silver medalists for Uruguay
South American Games medalists in field hockey
Competitors at the 2018 South American Games